Laurentius van Geel is a Dutch Paralympic swimmer. He represented the Netherlands at the 1992 Summer Paralympics in Barcelona, Spain and at the 1996 Summer Paralympics in Atlanta, Georgia, United States. In total he won one silver medal and two bronze medals.

At the 1992 Summer Paralympics, he won the silver medal in the men's 100 m Breaststroke SB7 event. At the 1996 Summer Paralympics, he won bronze medals in the men's 100 m Breaststroke SB7 and men's  Medley S7-10 events.

References

External links 
 

Living people
Year of birth missing (living people)
Place of birth missing (living people)
Dutch male breaststroke swimmers
Swimmers at the 1992 Summer Paralympics
Swimmers at the 1996 Summer Paralympics
Medalists at the 1992 Summer Paralympics
Medalists at the 1996 Summer Paralympics
Paralympic silver medalists for the Netherlands
Paralympic bronze medalists for the Netherlands
Paralympic medalists in swimming
Paralympic swimmers of the Netherlands
S7-classified Paralympic swimmers
20th-century Dutch people
21st-century Dutch people